Druid: Daemons of the Mind is an action role-playing video game developed by British studio Synthetic Dimensions and published by Sir-Tech for MS-DOS. It was later ported to Microsoft Windows, PlayStation and Sega Saturn by Koei in Japan.

Gameplay
Druid: Daemons of the Mind is an action role-playing game with graphic adventure elements.

Reception

Next Generation reviewed the PC version of the game, rating it four stars out of five, and stated that "hard-core fans of either RPGs or graphic adventures won't find much satisfaction. The puzzles can be rather simple, and though the story is well crafted and deep, role-playing fanatics will be annoyed at the lack of statistics and manipulation of your character. Still, if you're just getting into either genre, this one does a great job of taking some of the aspects of both."

Andy Butcher reviewed Druid: Daemons of the Mind for Arcane magazine, rating it a 5 out of 10 overall. Butcher comments that "the various elements don't really seem to fit together very well, and the game has a somewhat disjointed feel to it. Combine this with an awkward combat system that requires split-second timing, and you end up with something of a poor man's Ultima VIII (a game which Druid resembles in many ways)."

References

1995 video games
Action role-playing video games
Adventure games
DOS games
PlayStation (console) games
Sega Saturn games
Single-player video games
Sir-Tech games
Synthetic Dimensions games
Video games developed in the United Kingdom
Windows games